Ram Chander is an Indian politician. He has served as a member of the Delhi Legislative Assembly since 2017. He took office after winning a by-election for the seat from Bawana first elected in the 2015 Delhi Legislative Assembly election. Chander is affiliated with the Aam Aadmi Party.

References 

Year of birth missing (living people)
Living people
Aam Aadmi Party politicians from Delhi
Delhi MLAs 2015–2020